Bílý Potok may refer to places in the Czech Republic:

Bílý Potok (Liberec District), a municipality and village in the Liberec Region
Bílý Potok (Javorník), a village and part of Javorník in the Olomouc Region
Bílý Potok, a village and part of Vrbno pod Pradědem in the Moravian-Silesian Region

See also
Bili Potok, Bosnia and Herzegovina
Biały Potok, Poland